This was the first edition of the tournament.
Yaroslava Shvedova won the title, defeating Naomi Osaka in the final 6–4, 6–7(8–10), 6–4.

Seeds

Draw

Finals

Top half

Bottom half

Qualifying

Seeds

Qualifiers

Draw

First qualifier

Second qualifier

Third qualifier

Fourth qualifier

References 
 Main draw
 Qualifying draw

Women's Singles
Hua Hin Championships - Singles
 in women's tennis